Pwllglas (or Pwll-glâs) is a village in Denbighshire, Wales, near the town of Ruthin, and in the community of Efenechtyd.

Pwllglas is on the A494, which runs through the middle of the village, and contains three cul-de-sacs: Erw Las, Dyffryn, and Tan y Bryn. The nearby village of Bryn Saith Marchog is four miles away.

Pwllglas has a thriving local community centred on the village hall, and 2013 saw the reinstatement of a village shop in the hall, which won the "Village shop / Post office" category in the Countryside Alliance awards in February 2016. There is also a public house in the village, named The Fox and Hounds, and the nine-hole Ruthin-Pwllglas Golf Club lies just outside the village towards Ruthin.

References

Villages in Denbighshire